Eagarville is a village in Macoupin County, Illinois, United States. The population was 114 at the 2020 census.

Geography
Eagarville is located in southeastern Macoupin County at  (39.110422, -89.784289).

Bear Creek crosses the southwest corner of the village, and Spring Creek crosses the northeast corner. Both are southeast-flowing tributaries of Cahokia Creek, a southwest-flowing direct tributary of the Mississippi River.

Demographics

As of the census of 2000, there were 128 people, 45 households, and 34 families residing in the village. The racial makeup of the village was 100.00% White.

There were 45 households, out of which 33.3% had children under the age of 18 living with them, 68.9% were married couples living together, 4.4% had a female householder with no husband present, and 24.4% were non-families. 22.2% of all households were made up of individuals, and 13.3% had someone living alone who was 65 years of age or older. The average household size was 2.84 and the average family size was 3.38.

In the village, the population was spread out, with 31.3% under the age of 18, 6.3% from 18 to 24, 26.6% from 25 to 44, 23.4% from 45 to 64, and 12.5% who were 65 years of age or older. The median age was 36 years. For every 100 females, there were 124.6 males. For every 100 females age 18 and over, there were 109.5 males.

The median income for a household in the village was $31,667, and the median income for a family was $40,500. Males had a median income of $32,250 versus $25,000 for females. The per capita income for the village was $18,605. There were 7.1% of families and 4.2% of the population living below the poverty line, including no under eighteens and none of those over 64.

References

Villages in Macoupin County, Illinois
Villages in Illinois